Erwin Koen (born 7 September 1978) is a Dutch former footballer who played as a striker. Most of his career he played in the 2. Bundesliga.

References

External links
 

Living people
1978 births
People from Den Helder
Dutch footballers
Dutch expatriate footballers
Association football fullbacks
FC Groningen players
Rot-Weiss Essen players
Alemannia Aachen players
SC Paderborn 07 players
SV Wehen Wiesbaden players
FC Gütersloh 2000 players
SC Telstar players
De Treffers players
Eredivisie players
Eerste Divisie players
Bundesliga players
2. Bundesliga players
Expatriate footballers in Germany
Dutch expatriate sportspeople in Germany
Footballers from North Holland